Sumner is a city in northern Pierce County, Washington, United States.  The population was 10,621 at the 2020 census.  Nearby cities include Puyallup to the west, Auburn to the north, and Bonney Lake to the east.

History
Sumner was founded in 1853 as Stuck Junction and  platted in 1883 by George H. Ryan, in anticipation of a stop on the Northern Pacific Railway. The town was named "Franklin" until 1891, when the Post Office Department requested that the name be changed to avoid confusion with similarly named towns. The name of abolitionist Senator Charles Sumner was chosen for the town after a lottery.

Geography
Sumner is located at  (47.205823, -122.235803).

After Orting, Sumner and Puyallup are geographically next in line to be hit by lahars whenever Mount Rainier erupts in the future.  This is depicted in the Modern Marvels episode titled "Most Dangerous," which shows a simulation of a lahar flooding the Orting and Puyallup valleys from an eruption.

Demographics

2010 census
As of the census of 2010, there were 9,451 people, 3,980 households, and 2,454 families living in the city. The racial makeup of the city was 87.3% White, 1.2% African American, 1.0% Native American, 2.4% Asian, 0.4% Pacific Islander, 3.4% from other races, and 4.3% from two or more races. Hispanic or Latino of any race were 10.1% of the population.

There were 3,980 households, of which 31.8% had children under the age of 18 living with them, 40.8% were married couples living together, 14.7% had a female householder with no husband present, 6.2% had a male householder with no wife present, and 38.3% were non-families. 31.7% of all households were made up of individuals, and 13.1% had someone living alone who was 65 years of age or older. The average household size was 2.37 and the average family size was 2.97.

The median age in the city was 38.2 years. 24.4% of residents were under the age of 18; 8.1% were between the ages of 18 and 24; 26.7% were from 25 to 44; 25.8% were from 45 to 64; and 14.9% were 65 years of age or older. The gender makeup of the city was 48.2% male and 51.8% female.

2000 census
As of the census of 2000, there were 8,504 people, 3,517 households, and 2,215 families living in the city. The population density was 1,271.0 people per square mile (490.8/km2). There were 3,689 housing units at an average density of 551.4 per square mile (212.9/km2). The racial makeup of the city was 90.32% White, 0.93% African American, 1.41% Native American, 1.66% Asian, 0.24% Pacific Islander, 2.42% from other races, and 3.02% from two or more races. Hispanic or Latino of any race were 5.97% of the population.

There were 3,517 households, out of which 32.0% had children under the age of 18 living with them, 44.4% were married couples living together, 13.7% had a female householder with no husband present, and 37.0% were non-families. 30.7% of all households were made up of individuals, and 11.8% had someone living alone who was 65 years of age or older. The average household size was 2.40 and the average family size was 2.98.

In the city, the age distribution of the population shows 26.5% under the age of 18, 8.7% from 18 to 24, 30.3% from 25 to 44, 21.1% from 45 to 64, and 13.4% who were 65 years of age or older. The median age was 35 years. For every 100 females, there were 94.0 males. For every 100 females age 18 and over, there were 89.0 males.

The median income for a household in the city was $38,598, and the median income for a family was $42,602. Males had a median income of $36,250 versus $29,221 for females. The per capita income for the city was $18,696. About 4.5% of families and 8.5% of the population were below the poverty line, including 9.3% of those under age 18 and 8.6% of those age 65 or over.

Transportation
In addition to road and highway connections, Sumner is also served by Sounder commuter rail which stops at the railroad station in downtown and directly connects Sumner with much of the Puget Sound region, including Seattle and Tacoma.

Education

K-12 schools
Most of Sumner is in the Sumner School District. Portions are in the Dieringer School District and the Puyallup School District.

Public libraries
Sumner has a branch of the Pierce County Library System.

Cultural attractions
Sumner hosts part of the annual four-part Daffodil Parade, which takes place every April in Tacoma, Puyallup, Sumner, and Orting.

Notable people
 Eddie Dew, actor and director, was born in Sumner.
 Wayne Northrop, actor, is from Sumner.
 Kelly Joe Phelps, musician, grew up in Sumner.

Notable companies
Dillanos Coffee Roasters, Pacific Northwest Baking Company, and Bellmont Cabinets are all based in Sumner.

Notes

External links

 City of Sumner
 Pierce County Library System
 

Cities in Washington (state)
Cities in Pierce County, Washington
Cities in the Seattle metropolitan area